This is a of British scientists.

Before the 16th century 

 Adelard of Bath (1080-1150), mathematician, astronomer, physicist, alchemist and philosopher
 Robert Grosseteste (1168-1253), philosopher
 Johannes de Sacrobosco (1195-1256), mathematician and astronomer
 Roger Bacon (1212-1292), mathematician, astronomer, alchemist and philosopher
 John Peckham (1230-1292), astronomer 
 William Ockham (1287-1347), theologian, philosopher and physicist
 Richard of Wallingford (1292-1336), mathematician and astronomer 
 John Dastin (1293-1386), alchemist 
 Thomas Bradwardine (1300-1349), mathematician, physicist, theologian and philosopher 
 Simon Bredon (1300-1379), mathematician 
 John Westwyk (14th century), astronomer
 John Ardarne (1307-1392), physician
 George Ripley (1415-1490), alchemist
 Thomas Norton (1416-1513), alchemist

16th–17th century
Emery Molyneux (1500-1598), astronomer
William Gilbert (1544-1603), physician and philosopher 
John Gerard (1545-1612), botanist 
Robert Hues (1553-1632), geographer and mathematician 
Francis Bacon (1561-1626), philosopher 
William Crabtree (1610-1644), mathematician and astronomer
Jeremiah Horrocks (1618-1641), astronomer 
Nicholas Culpeper (1616–1654), physician 
Lawrence Rooke (1622-1662), mathematician and astronomer 
Francis Willoughby (1635-1672), biologist 
İsaac Barrow (1640-1676), mathematician and theologian 
 Robert Hooke (1635-1703), scientist: physicist, botanist, biologist, philosopher, sage, mathematician, astronomer, architect, wise, inventor
 İsaac Newton (1642-1727), mathematician, physicist, astronomer, alchemist, philosopher, theologian, inventor 
 Thomas Savery (1650-1715), architect, inventor an polymath 
 John Flamsteed (1646-1719), astronomer

See also
List of British scientists
List of British innovations and discoveries
History of England

British scholars